Cindy Marie Sampson (born May 27, 1978) is a Canadian director and actress (film and television).   She is known for her role in the Canadian television series Private Eyes.

Biography 
Sampson was born in Halifax, Nova Scotia, Canada on May 27, 1978.  She attended Randolph Academy for the Performing Arts, training in dance and theatre. 

In February 2012 she traveled to Bouvet Island in the South Atlantic Ocean, the most remote island on Earth, and climbed to the island's summit while filming the "docu-fiction" movie Expedition for the Future. 

She married fellow Canadian Ryan Wickel on July 7, 2016.

Career

Films 
Sampson's biggest film role was as Zoe Ravena in Live Once, Die Twice. For the film The Shrine, Sampson was required to watch a specific list of horror films in preparation for the role. She also appeared in the crime thriller film The Factory.
Sampson was cast by Hank White to play Kelly Stone in his feature film Charlie Zone.

Television 
Sampson appeared in Season 3 of Supernatural as the character Lisa Braedon, in the episode "The Kids Are Alright" in 2007. She reprised the role for the episode "Dream a Little Dream of Me" after showrunner Eric Kripke could not get the rights to use the character Jason Voorhees, the villain of the Friday the 13th horror film series. Sampson's character was brought back in the fifth-season episodes "99 Problems" and "Swan Song" as setup to season six, in which she appeared in 11 episodes. Her final appearance was in the episode "Let It Bleed" (season 6, episode 21). 

In 2015, Sampson appeared in three episodes of Rookie Blue, a Canadian police drama television series starring Missy Peregrym and Gregory Smith, followed by eight episodes as Sophie Hale in the third season of the Canadian-British co-production  Rogue, which stars Thandie Newton and Cole Hauser.

In 2016 the Global Television Network launched the TV series Private Eyes, in which Sampson stars as Angie Everett, an experienced private investigator who takes on an ex-hockey player, Matt Shade (Jason Priestley), as a junior partner. She also directed one episode of the series.

Sampson's other appearances include Reaper, The Last Kiss, Being Human, Footsteps, Proof of Lies, Pretty Dead Flowers, and Swamp Devil. She also portrayed Sandra MacLaren in Rumours as well as the "Strong Brushing Arm" woman in a commercial spot for Listerine mouthwash.

Filmography

Film

Television

References

External links 
 

1978 births
Canadian film actresses
Canadian television actresses
Living people
Actresses from Halifax, Nova Scotia
20th-century Canadian actresses
21st-century Canadian actresses
Randolph College for the Performing Arts alumni